The Foundation for Iranian Studies is an American non-profit institution founded in 1981 in Washington DC, and later moved to Maryland, dedicated to educating the public about Iran/Persia. Since 1982 they host an oral history program.
The director of the foundation is Mahnaz Afkhami, former women minister in Iran. 

The foundation was founded with the support of Princess Ashraf Pahlavi. It has organized various Persian cultural events with cooperation of American universities, museums and academic institutions in the United States, including George Town University, National Museum of Asian Art (formerly known as Freer|Sackler Galleries of Smithsonian Institutions), Society of Iranian Studies, Pacific Museum, Middle East Studies Association, etc.

Oral History project
In early 1980s the foundation launched its oral history project to save the memories and information of pre-revolutionary Persian artsis, politicians, diplomats, etc. This project was directed by Gholam-Reza Afkhami.

Iran Nameh
Since 1982 until 2016 the foundation published the Persian-language journal Iran Nameh, edited by Jalal Matini.

Foundation for Iranian Studies has published over 20 books in English and Persian. It has also offered a prize to the best PhD dissertations on Persian/Iranian culture and art.

See also
 Iranian studies
 Iranology Foundation

References

Sources
 Foundation for Iranian Studies, Dissertation of the Year Awards
 Foundation for Iranian Studies' publications in WorldCat
 C-span: Gholam Reza Afkhami of Foundation for Iranian Studies

Educational foundations in the United States
Iranian studies
Oral history